Isaiah 40 is the fortieth chapter of the Book of Isaiah in the Hebrew Bible or the Old Testament of the Christian Bible, and the first chapter of the section known as "Deutero-Isaiah" (Isaiah 40-55), dating from the time of the Israelites' exile in Babylon. This book contains the prophecies attributed to the prophet Isaiah, and is one of the Books of the Prophets. Parts of this chapter are cited in all four canonical Gospels of the New Testament.

Text 
The original text was written in Hebrew language. This chapter is divided into 31 verses.

Textual witnesses 
Some early manuscripts containing the text of this chapter in Hebrew are of the Masoretic Text tradition, which includes the Codex Cairensis (895), the Petersburg Codex of the Prophets (916), Aleppo Codex (10th century), Codex Leningradensis (1008).

Fragments containing parts of this chapter were found among the Dead Sea Scrolls (3rd century BC or later):
 1QIsaa: complete
 1QIsab: extant verses 1-4
 4QIsab (4Q56): extant verses 1‑4, 22‑26
 5Q3 (5QIsa): extant verses 16, 18‑19

There is also a translation into Koine Greek known as the Septuagint, made in the last few centuries BCE. Extant ancient manuscripts of the Septuagint version include Codex Vaticanus (B; B; 4th century), Codex Sinaiticus (S; BHK: S; 4th century), Codex Alexandrinus (A; A; 5th century) and Codex Marchalianus (Q; Q; 6th century).

New Testament references
: Matthew 3:1–12; ; ; 
: 
:

Parashot
The parashah sections listed here are based on the Aleppo Codex. Isaiah 40 is a part of the Consolations (Isaiah 40–66). {P}: open parashah; {S}: closed parashah.
 {P} 40:1-2 {S} 40:3-5 {P} 40:6-8 {S} 40:9-11 {S} 40:12-16 {P} 40:17-20 {S} 40:21-24 {S} 40:25-26 {S} 40:27-31 {S}

Structure
John Skinner, in the Cambridge Bible for Schools and Colleges commentary, refers to verses 1-11 as the prologue (to Deutero-Isaiah).

Prepare the Way for the LORD (40:1–5)

Verse 1
Comfort,
comfort my people,
says your God.
"Your": The pronominal suffix is second masculine plural, may refer to "God’s people" or "unidentified heralds commanded to comfort Jerusalem".

Verse 2
 Speak tenderly to Jerusalem, and cry to her
that her warfare is ended,
that her iniquity is pardoned,
that she has received from the Lord's hand
double for all her sins.
In the Septuagint this passage is addressed to the priests.

Verse 3
 The voice of him that crieth in the wilderness, Prepare ye the way of the Lord, make straight in the desert a highway for our God.
This verse is cited in all four gospels in New Testament as fulfilled in the person of John the Baptist, who prepared for the coming of Jesus Christ the Lord (Matthew 3:1–3; Mark 1:2–; Luke 3:2–6; John 1:23). John himself confessed that the verse pertains to him:
 He [John the Baptist] said, "I am the voice of one crying out in the wilderness, 'Make straight the way of the Lord,' as the prophet Isaiah said".

Some English translations associate the reference to "the wilderness" with "the voice which cries out": examples include the King James Version and New King James Version, the Geneva Bible, Wycliffe's translation, the Darby Bible and Brenton's translation of the Septuagint. In more recent translations, "the wilderness" is associated with the place where the way of the Lord is to be prepared: examples include the ASV, Common English Bible, Contemporary English Version, English Standard Version, Jerusalem Bible, Revised Standard Version and New Revised Standard Version:
A voice cries:
"In the wilderness prepare the way of the Lord".

Verse 4
 Every valley shall be exalted, and every mountain and hill shall be made low: and the crooked shall be made straight, and the rough places plain:
Cited in Luke 3:5.

Verse 5
 And the glory of the Lord shall be revealed, and all flesh shall see it together:
 for the mouth of the Lord hath spoken it.
Cited in Luke 3:6.

The Enduring Word (40:6–8)

Verse 6
The voice said, Cry.
 And he said, What shall I cry?
 All flesh is grass, 
and all the goodliness thereof is as the flower of the field:
(also see ;). 
Cited in 1 Peter 1:24.

Verse 7
The grass withers, the flower fades
because the Spirit of the Lord blows upon it;
surely the people are grass.
"Spirit of the Lord": can also rendered as "wind of Jehovah" or may refer to the "withering east wind of those countries sent by Jehovah".

Verse 8

The grass withers, the flower fades,
but the word of our God shall stand forever.
Cited together with Isaiah 40:6 in 1 Peter 1:24–25.

Here Is Your God! (40:9–31)

Verse 13
 Who has directed the Spirit of the Lord,
 Or as His counselor has taught Him?
 Cross reference: 
 Cited in Romans 11:34

Verse 22

It is he who sits above the circle of the earth,
and its inhabitants are like grasshoppers;
who stretches out the heavens like a curtain,
and spreads them like a tent to dwell in;

Westermann notes the similarity of parts of this verse to other Bible verses: verse 22a vs. b and verse 22b vs. b.
It can refer to
 the full circuit the seen and unseen halves of the stars across the dome of the sky, or 
 the vault of heaven extending "in a half-circle from horizon to horizon", or
 a circular observable horizon (cf.)
It is to emphasize the range of God’s authority "over everything the eye can see in every direction, even to the distant ends of the earth," but not necessarily refer to the "circular nature of the earth."
 Rashi mentions an expression with the same root in  "and with a compass (וּבַמְּחוּגָה)" to view this word as a "circle" (as made by a compass). A newer edition of the Douay–Rheims Bible renders it as "globe" – and so does the Spanish version of the Jubilee Bible (el globo, although the English version renders as "circle") – but an older edition of the Douay-Reims renders it as "compasse" (original spelling in 1582 CE).

Uses

Modern literature
A part of the Hebrew text of Isaiah 40:4 was used by Shmuel Yosef Agnon as the title for his 1912-novella, "Vehaya Ha'akov Lemishor" ("The Crooked Shall Be Made Straight").

Music
The King James Version of verses 1–5, 9 and 11 from this chapter is cited as texts in the English-language oratorio "Messiah" by George Frideric Handel (HWV 56).

See also
All flesh is grass
Christian messianic prophecies
John the Baptist
Messianic prophecies of Jesus
Related Bible parts: Exodus 19, Jeremiah 23, Matthew 3, Mark 1, Luke 3, John 1, Romans 11,  1 Peter 1, 1 Peter 5

Notes

References

Sources

External links

Jewish
Isaiah 40: Hebrew with Parallel English

Christian
Isaiah 40 English Translation with Parallel Latin Vulgate

40
Christian messianism